Atteva wallengreni is a moth of the Attevidae family. It is found in China (Guangdong, Hainan, Hongkong and Shaanxi), Indonesia (Bali), Malaysia (Perak), Thailand and Vietnam.

The length of the forewings is 11–15 mm. The forewings are orange, with 29 to 55 white dots, some (especially submarginal dots) are fused to form a bar-like marking. The hindwings are orange, and semitransparent near to the base.

Etymology
The species is named for Hans Daniel Johan Wallengren, the Swedish entomologist who described this species under the name Amblothridia fabricella.

References 

Moths described in 2013
Attevidae